Diego Jesús Quintana (born 24 April 1978) is an Argentine footballer who spent his career mostly playing for Skoda Xanthi F.C. in Greece.

Quintana started his career in 1996 with Newell's Old Boys where he played 140 times, scoring 18 goals. After three seasons with Real Murcia of Spain he returned to Argentina to play for newly promoted Instituto de Cordoba in the Apertura 2004 tournament. After a brief spell with Barcelona Sporting Club of Ecuador in 2005 he joined Skoda Xanthi F.C. of Greece.

He scored the winning goal at the FIFA Youth World Cup in 1997 against Uruguay in front of 62,000 spectators at the Shah Alam Stadium in Kuala Lumpur, Malaysia.

External links
Guardian statistics
  Argentine Primera statistics

1978 births
Living people
Footballers from Rosario, Santa Fe
Argentine footballers
Argentine expatriate footballers
Argentine expatriate sportspeople in Spain
Newell's Old Boys footballers
Instituto footballers
Real Murcia players
Barcelona S.C. footballers
Xanthi F.C. players
Argentine Primera División players
Segunda División players
Super League Greece players
Expatriate footballers in Ecuador
Expatriate footballers in Spain
Expatriate footballers in Greece
Argentina youth international footballers
Argentina under-20 international footballers
Association football forwards
Association football midfielders